Dawn Shadforth is a British director of music videos, TV, and film and a visual artist. She was originally a fine artist making work with objects, light, video and sound.  She won the Whitworth Young Contemporaries Award for the installation "Sweet Dreams" in 1991 which was exhibited in Manchester and Sheffield. Shadforth later became a music-video and television director, receiving many awards for her work in music video including: Best New Director at The 1998 CAD Awards, Best Director at the 2001 CAD Awards. Visionary Video at the VH1/Vogue Fashion Awards. The Icon Award at the 2010 UK Music Video Awards. And for dramatic work she won a BIFA for Best British Short Film at the 2018 British Independent Film Awards for the short film The Big Day, and subsequently nominated for two BAFTAs in 2019 for Breakthrough talent for Trust episode "Silenzio" and in 2021 for Best Mini-Series for Adult Material.

Early life
Shadforth was born on 10 November 1973 in Billericay, Essex, England the daughter of a pharmacist Richard Shadforth and ceramacist Sue Shadforth. She graduated from Sheffield Hallam University with a 1st Class Hons Degree in Fine Art - Sculpture. In 2018 Sheffield Hallam University awarded her with an honorary doctorate.

Career

Early work
In 1995, Shadforth directed The Friends Tale, a 10-minute experimental docudrama for Channel 4's Battered Britain series. Around the same time she directed The Seven Year Glitch, an experimental film documenting the Warp Records seven-year anniversary tour, screened at onedotzero in London, United Kingdom and Sónar in Barcelona, Spain.

Music video
In 1996, Shadforth directed a music video for the track "Hush" by Kurtis Mantronik. The video was filmed in Brooklyn in New York City and Sheffield. It features cameos by Todd Terry, Róisín Murphy, Jason Buckle from the band Relaxed Muscle and DJ Winston Hazel amongst others. In 1997, Shadforth's music video for Sheffield band All Seeing I's single "Beat Goes On" won for Best Dance Video at the 1998 Muzik Video Awards and for Best New Director and Best Editing at the 1999 CAD Awards.

In 2000 Shadforth directed a video for Garbage’s "Special" featuring the band dog fighting in futuristic aircraft in the skies above a barren desert planet. The video was awarded Visionary Video at the VH1/Vogue Fashion Awards.  

In 2001, Shadforth made the Kylie Minogue video "Can't Get You Out of My Head". The video features Minogue in a computer generated futuristic city, arriving in a space-age car, seductively and rhythmically shifting the gearstick as she drives, before eventually dancing in a clipped pulsating style in front of a group of male dancers all wearing red plastic headgear. The video is well known for its tight choreography as well as for featuring Minogue in a deceptively revealing white costume with a plunging neckline and wide open front. The video was quickly picked up by many music video channels and is credited with making the song a number one hit worldwide. The exposure from the video quickly made Shadforth a "must have" director, and the film has been widely mimicked and parodied.

She also directed the award-winning promo film for "The Importance of Being Idle", the acclaimed second single from 2005's comeback album by Oasis, Don't Believe the Truth. The film was a clever pastiche of 1960s black and white kitchen sink drama films, featuring a parade of high-kicking undertakers, led by the Welsh actor Rhys Ifans. (The name of the undertaking firm featured in the video is 'Shadforth and Sons'). The band themselves praised the video, and it was said by critics at the time to be the best video Oasis had ever made. It went on to win the award for Best Video of 2005 at the NME Awards in early 2006, and the song itself went to Number 1.

In 2016, "Lights" by Hurts following a drunkenly amorous Theo Hutchcroft through the ups and downs of a night on the tiles and featuring intricate dance routines, and "Old Skool" by Metronomy featuring Sharon Horgan as a twitchy, alien 70's housewife, both directed by Dawn, were nominated for 6 awards collectively at the UKMVA's. "Lights" by Hurts also won Dawn a special achievement award at the 2015 1:4 Awards.

Film and television
In 2017 Shadforth directed The Big Day, a short film written by Kellie Smith produced as part of the BFI I-Write scheme by Michelle Eastwood. The film went on to win the British Independent Film Award (BIFA) for Best British Short Film at the 2018 British Independent Film Awards.      

She followed this with acclaimed work on long-form TV drama, beginning with Trust in 2017, for which she was nominated for Breakthrough Talent at the 2018 BAFTA Awards. In 2018 she directed episode 3 of the adaptation of Phillip Pullman's epic saga His Dark Materials.  

In 2019, Shadforth directed the mini-series Adult Material, written by playwright Lucy Kirkwood, a drama examining themes of power and consent following the life of a working mother within the UK adult entertainment industry, for Channel 4 and Netflix. The show starred Hayley Squires and featuring among others Rupert Everett, Sienna Kelly, Kerry Godliman and Joe Dempsie. It garnered rave reviews and was nominated for five BAFTA awards in 2021 including Best Miniseries. Squires won an International Emmy for her performance in the show.

Shadforth followed this with Mood, written by Nicôle Lecky for BBC Worldwide and AMC in 2021, shot in East London during the pandemic. The show combines fantasy music sequences with comedy drama and was critically well received.  

In 2022 directed all episodes of a Christmas special of I Hate Suzie, the show created by Billie Piper and Lucy Prebble and produced by Badwolf for Sky Atlantic which was received to universal acclaim and 4 and 5 star reviews across all press.        
https://www.theguardian.com/tv-and-radio/2022/dec/20/i-hate-suzie-too-review-amy-winehouse-and-caroline-flack-haunt-this-astounding-show
https://www.telegraph.co.uk/tv/2022/12/20/hate-suzie-review-tv-drama-raw-honest-cant-look-away/
https://www.independent.co.uk/arts-entertainment/tv/reviews/i-hate-suzie-too-cast-review-billie-piper-b2249046.html

Selected director videography

References

External links
https://www.imdb.com/name/nm1516369/?ref_=nv_sr_srsg_0
Official site at Black Dog Films (US)/RSA

Dawn Shadforth at the Internet Music Video Database
Dawn Shadforth at Clipland

English music video directors
People from Essex
1973 births
Living people
Female music video directors